China State Construction may refer to:

China State Construction Engineering Corp
China State Construction International Holdings